Bay State is an ongoing television series broadcast on butv10 on the Boston University campus. Originated in 1991, Bay State is the longest-running continuously produced student soap opera in the United States. The series is set at the fictional Beacon Hill College and focuses on the sordid lives of the students there. The 150th episode of Bay State aired in January 2016.

History
Bay State was created in 1991 by Delaina Dixon and Tom Rotolo, making it the longest-running continuously produced student soap opera in the United States. Dixon was inspired by a 1989 episode of 48 Hours profiling a student soap opera at UCLA called University, which was produced from 1986 to 1990. Entirely student-produced, Bay State originally aired on the Boston University campus via closed-circuit television and screenings, was broadcast by the public-access television service Boston Neighborhood Network, and was eventually streamed on the internet. The Boston University College of Communication premiered its own channel, butv10, on February 22, 2006, which includes Bay State in its ongoing programming.

In 1995, Bay State was featured on MTV News and Extra.

The 150th episode of Bay State aired in January 2016.

Plot
Using the tagline "Sex, drugs and murder", the series is set at the fictional Beacon Hill College and focuses on the sordid lives of the students there. It explores social issues related to college students, as well as the dramatic storylines indicative of soap operas.

Series overview

Notable cast and crew
Bay State has featured guest appearances by Days of Our Lives actors Kristian Alfonso, Alison Sweeney and Austin Peck, as well as The Daily Show host Jon Stewart. Miss Hawaii USA 1992 Heather Hays, later a news anchor at KDFW, appeared on the show in 1993. In the 2000s, the series featured Sarah Hartshorne (as "Samantha Carver") before her appearance on The CW's America's Next Top Model in 2007. Kate Hackett, creator of the web series Classic Alice, also appeared on Bay State.

Notable crew members include Dixon, an entertainment journalist and host of VH1's The Gossip Table; Catherine Burns of The Moth; Rotolo, a TV production manager and producer; and Nicole Savini, senior producer of The Colbert Report.

Awards and nominations

References

External links
 
 Official butv10 website
 
 

1991 American television series debuts
1990s American television series
2000s American television series
2010s American television series
2020s American television series
1990s American college television series
2000s American college television series
2010s American college television series
2020s American college television series
American television soap operas
Butv
English-language television shows
Student-produced television series
Television shows set in Boston